Teymanak-e Olya (also Romanized as Teymanak-e ‘Olyā and Teymanak ‘Olyā; also known as Teymanak and Teymanak-e Bālā) is a village in Jolgeh-ye Musaabad Rural District, in the Central District of Torbat-e Jam County, Razavi Khorasan Province, Iran. At the 2006 census, its population was 559, in 117 families.

References 

Populated places in Torbat-e Jam County